The Wake is the second solo album by Scott Kelly from Neurosis. It is largely acoustic guitar music which is much different stylistically from the output of his primary band.

Track listing
 The Ladder in My Blood
 Figures
 Saturn's Eye
 The Searcher
 Catholic Blood
 In My World
 Remember Me

References

2008 albums
Scott Kelly (musician) albums